The Central American campaign may refer to:

 The Central American campaign of the Anglo-Spanish War
 The Filibuster War